New Braunfels is a city in Comal and Guadalupe counties in the U.S. state of Texas known for its German Texan heritage. It is the seat of Comal County. A suburb just north of San Antonio, and part of the Greater San Antonio metropolitan area, it was the third-fastest-growing city in the United States from 2010 to 2020.

History

New Braunfels was established in 1845 by Prince Carl of Solms-Braunfels, Commissioner General of the Mainzer Adelsverein, also known as the Noblemen's Society. Prince Carl named the settlement in honor of his home of Solms-Braunfels, Germany.

The Adelsverein organized hundreds of people in Germany to settle in Texas. Immigrants from Germany began arriving at Galveston in July 1844. Most then traveled by ship to Indianola in December 1844, and began the overland journey to the Fisher-Miller land grant purchased by Prince Carl. At the urging of John Coffee Hays, who realized the settlers would not have time to build homes and plant crops further inland before winter, and as the German settlers were traveling inland along the Guadalupe River, they stopped near the Comal Springs. Prince Carl bought two leagues of land from Rafael Garza and Maria Antonio Veramendi Garza for $1,111.00.

The land was located northeast of San Antonio on El Camino Real de los Tejas and had the strong freshwater Comal Springs, known as Las Fontanas, when the Germans arrived. It was about halfway between Indianola and the lower portions of the Fisher-Miller land grant. The first settlers forded the Guadalupe River on Good Friday, March 21, 1845, near the present-day Faust Street bridge.

As the spring of 1845 progressed, the settlers built the "Zinkenburg", a fort named for Adelsverein civil engineer Nicolaus Zink, divided the land, and began building homes and planting crops. Prince Carl would also lay the cornerstone for the Sophienburg, a permanent fort and center for the immigrant association.

In 1844, Prince Carl was so disillusioned with the logistics of the colonization that he asked the Verein to remove him as commissioner-general and appoint a successor. When John O. Meusebach arrived, the finances were in disarray, due in part to Prince Carl's lack of business experience and his refusal to keep financial records. To a larger degree, the financial situation happened because the Adelsverein was an organization of noblemen with no practical backgrounds at running businesses. They were on the other side of the world and did not witness the situation with which both Prince Carl and Meusebach were dealing. Henry Francis Fisher had not supplied transport and supplies for which the Verein advanced money to him. Meusebach found Prince Carl in Galveston trying to return to Germany, detained by authorities for unpaid bills. Meusebach made good on the debts, so Prince Carl could depart.

Meusebach discovered that Prince Carl's choice of the inadequate Carlshafen (Indianola) as a port of entry, as well as the isolated route to New Braunfels, was deliberately chosen to keep the Germans from interacting with any Americans.  According to Nicolaus Zink, Prince Carl had planned to establish a German feudal state by secretly bringing in immigrants and placing them in military fortresses. Meusebach, who had renounced his own title of nobility, took a different approach and invited Americans to settle in the Vereins territory.

Prince Carl, being an officer of the Imperial Army of Austria, had kept a uniformed military unit at the ready in Indianola.  Meusebach converted the military unit to a more needed work detail. A finance and business structure for the colony was put in place by Meusebach. He also provided for adequate food and shelter for the colonists. On August 11, 1845, Hermann Friedrich Seele became the first teacher for the German-English school in New Braunfels. Meusebach established friendly relations with a local tribe of Waco Indians. Upon seeing his reddish-blonde hair, they called him Ma-be-quo-si-to-mu, "Chief with the burning hair of the head".

In May 1846, Meusebach received a letter from Count Castell informing him 4,304 emigrants were on their way to Texas. With no funds and no new settlements, the mass of emigrants was stalled at Carlshafen. Meusebach's requests to the Verein for more money, and his warnings of pending bankruptcy for the Verein, brought no results. As a last resort, Meusebach instructed D.H. Klaener to publish the plight in the German news media. Embarrassed by the publicity, the Verein established a $60,000 letter of credit. The amount was not adequate for sustaining the total number of German emigrants in Texas, but Castell also sent Philip Cappes as special commissioner to observe the situation. Cappes had also been instructed by Castell to observe Meusebach and to secretly report back every detail. By the time Cappes departed in March 1847, he recommended another $200,000 be advanced.

Cappes invited Henry Francis Fisher to New Braunfels, in spite of Fisher not being entirely trustworthy to the Verein. As of February 11, 1845, Fisher had been involved in coercing newly arrived immigrants to sign documents stating their intent to depart from the Verein and align with Fisher's friend Dr. Friedrich Schubbert, also known as Friedrich Strubberg.

Cappes was not in town when Meusebach was breakfast host to Fisher on December 31, 1846. Posters had mysteriously appeared about town maligning Meusebach, saying "Curses upon Meusebach the slave driver", and inciting colonists to free themselves from his "tyranny". A group led by Rudolph Iwonski pushed their way into Meusebach's home, and colonist C. Herber brandished a whip. Herber was an alleged counterfeiter to whom Count Castell had awarded asylum. Meusebach and Herber shared a dislike of one another.

The colonists' list of demands included Meusebach resigning as commissioner-general and turning the colonization over to Fisher. Meusebach kept his composure, but the group became so heated, they yelled, "Hang him!" When the estimated 120 men dispersed, Fisher was nowhere to be found. The same evening, a different group of individuals assembled and pledged to stand by Meusebach, the next day passing resolutions condemning the actions of the mob. Meusebach himself had considered leaving Texas as early as November 1845, when he wrote to Count Castell and announced his intention to resign and return to Germany. Meusebach did not feel the Adelsverein was organized enough to achieve its goals. After the mob visit in New Braunfels, he again submitted his resignation to accompany a financial report to Castell on January 23, 1847.

Meusebach had arranged with the Torrey Brothers for transporting the emigrants inland, but the United States hired the Torrey Brothers for use in the Mexican–American War.

Meusebach stabilized the community's finances, and encouraged the settlers to establish additional neighboring communities. The largest of these secondary settlements was Fredericksburg,  to the northwest of New Braunfels.

New Braunfels thrived, and by 1850, it was the fourth-largest city in Texas, with 1,723 people, following only Galveston, San Antonio, and Houston in population. In 1852, the Zeitung newspaper was established, edited by German Texan botanist Ferdinand Lindheimer. The newspaper continues to publish under its current name, the Herald-Zeitung.

Geography

New Braunfels is located in southeastern Comal County.

The city is situated along the Balcones Fault, where the Texas Hill Country meets rolling prairie land. Along the fault in the city, a string of artesian springs known as Comal Springs gives rise to the Comal River, which is known as one of the shortest rivers in the world, as it winds  through the city before meeting the Guadalupe River.

Gruene 

Gruene Historical District is located within the city limits of New Braunfels. Founded by the sons of settlers Ernst and Antoinette Gruene, the community had a bank, post office, school, general store, lumberyard, gristmill, dance hall, and cotton gin. It also had access to two railways for shipping cotton bales. Its most famous attribute was the dance hall, a family activity in those days. Due to the failure of the cotton crop from boll weevils, and the failure of the banks after 1929, commercial activity slowed to a crawl. This village is now a Nationally Registered Historic District where one can dine in the ruins of the original gristmill or enjoy live music at Gruene Hall.

Climate 

New Braunfels experiences a humid subtropical climate, with hot, humid summers and generally mild winters. Temperatures range from 100 °F (27.8 °C) in the summer to 49 °F (9.4 °C) during winter.

The city falls in USDA hardiness zones 8b (15 °F to 20 °F) and 9a (20 °F to 25 °F). New Braunfels and San Antonio,  to the southwest, are some of the most flood-prone regions in North America. The October 1998 Central Texas floods were among the costliest floods in United States history, resulting in $750 million in damage and 32 deaths. In 2002, from June 30 to July 7,  of rain fell in the area, resulting in widespread flooding and 12 fatalities.

May, June, and October have quite a bit of precipitation. The average annual precipitation has been .

Demographics

As of the 2020 United States census, there were 90,403 people, 30,855 households, and 20,946 families residing in the city.

At the census of 2000, 36,494 people, 13,558 households, and 9,599 families resided in the city. The population density was 1,247.7 people per square mile (481.7/km2). The 14,896 housing units averaged 509.3 per square mile (196.6/km2). The racial makeup of the city was 84.30% White, 1.37% African American, 0.55% Native American, 0.58% Asian, 0.03% Pacific Islander, 10.93% from other races, and 2.24% from two or more races. Hispanics or Latinos of any race were 34.52% of the population.

For the year 2015, New Braunfels was named the U.S.'s second-fastest growing city with a population of 50,000 or more, according to estimates by the U.S. Census Bureau.

In 2019, the American Community Survey determined there were 90,209 residents, up 56.4% since the 2010 U.S. census which determined the population was 57,740. The population density was 1,316.1 people per square mile. In 2019, the racial and ethnic makeup of New Braunfels was 60.4% non-Hispanic white, 2.0% Black or African American, 0.4% American Indian or Alaska Native, 1.5% Asian, 2.1% from two or more races, and 34.4% Hispanic or Latin American of any race. By 2020, its population grew to 90,403 residents.

The 2019 American Community Survey estimated 62.2% of housing units were owner-occupied and the median selected monthly owner costs were $1,599 with a mortgage, and $509 without a mortgage. The city had a median gross rent of $1,183 and there were a total of 28,835 households with an average of 2.72 persons per household. In 2019, the median household income was $71,044 and the per capita income was $33,405. An estimated 8.6% of New Braunfels lived at or below the poverty line.

Of the 13,558 households at the 2000 census, 33.4% had children under the age of 18 living with them, 55.4% were married couples living together, 11.5% had a female householder with no husband present, and 29.2% were not families. About 24.8% of all households were made up of individuals, and 12.0% had someone living alone who was 65 years of age or older. The average household size was 2.60 and the average family size was 3.11. In 2000, the population was distributed as 25.7% under the age of 18, 8.5% from 18 to 24, 28.4% from 25 to 44, 20.6% from 45 to 64, and 16.9% who were 65 years of age or older. The median age was 36 years. For every 100 females, there were 91.9 males. For every 100 females age 18 and over, there were 88.3 males.

The median income for a household in the city was $40,078, and for a family was $46,726 in 2000. Males had a median income of $31,140 versus $23,235 for females. The per capita income for the city was $18,548. About 9.0% of families and 10.9% of the population were below the poverty line, including 14.9% of those under age 18 and 9.7% of those age 65 or over.

Economy

Companies based in New Braunfels include Rush Enterprises and Schlitterbahn. The top employers in the area are:

Education

Most of the city is served by the New Braunfels Independent School District and the Comal Independent School District in separate places. Small portions in Guadalupe County are within the Marion Independent School District and the Navarro Independent School District.

Two traditional public high schools are located within city limits, as well as a freshmen center. The public high schools are New Braunfels High School, Canyon High School, and Alamo Colleges-Memorial Early College High School. Private high schools are New Braunfels Christian Academy, a K–12 institution, and the Calvary Baptist Academy.

NBISD operates several schools in New Braunfels.

CISD schools serving New Braunfels are:
 Morningside, Clear Spring, Goodwin Frazier, Hoffmann Lane, and Freiheit elementary schools
 Canyon Middle and Church Hill Middle
 Canyon High

Recreation and tourism

The town holds "Wurstfest", a German-style sausage festival, every November, drawing on the city's strong German heritage. Every December, the town celebrates Wassailfest in the historic downtown.

New Braunfels draws a large number of tourists, particularly in the summer because of the cold-spring rivers that run through the city. Many generations of families and college students return every summer to tube for miles down the Guadalupe and Comal rivers. New Braunfels is the site of the original water park, the Schlitterbahn WaterPark Resort. The Ernest Eikel Skate Park attracts many skate board enthusiasts.

New Braunfels also hosts a Buc-ee's gas station, which is recognized as the largest gas station in the world.

The 10,000-capacity Unicorn Stadium is the largest sports venue by capacity in New Braunfels. It opened in 1927 and it is used mostly for American football and soccer. The venue also has an athletics track.

Media communications

The newspaper Herald Zeitung was originally two newspapers: The Herald (published in English) and The Zeitung, which means "newspaper", (published in German) until 1967.

The other newspaper publisher serving the city of New Braunfels is the TX Citizen, formerly the NB citizen.

In radio, two stations broadcast from New Braunfels, KGNB 1420 AM and KNBT 92.1 FM, notable for its Americana music format.

Notable people

 Louis Beam, American white supremacist and neo-fascist
 Lance Berkman, six-time MLB All-Star, attended Canyon High School in New Braunfels
 Donna Campbell, Republican state senator from New Braunfels since 2013
 Parker Chase, American professional racing driver
 Sherman Corbett, former pitcher for the California Angels.
 Charles Duke, Apollo Lunar Module pilot on the Apollo 16 Moon landing mission
 Abby Dunkin, American 3.5 point wheelchair basketball player
 Craig Jordan, pioneer in the use of Tamoxifen as an adjuvant therapy for breast cancer treatment and prevention, used in millions of patients
 Ray Katt, Major League Baseball player
 Kliff Kingsbury, former head coach of NFL's Arizona Cardinals
 Robert Krueger, Democrat, former U.S. Representative and former interim (appointed) U.S. senator
 Ferdinand Lindheimer, known as the father of Texas botany
 Leigh Nash, member of the band Sixpence None the Richer
 George E. Nowotny, Republican member of the Arkansas House of Representatives from 1967 to 1972, born in New Braunfels in 1932
 Demi Payne, American track and field athlete
 Victoria Scott, American writer of young adult fiction novels
 Jordan Westburg, American professional baseball shortstop
 Dustin Ybarra, American stand-up comedian actor

Notable films and television

Johnny Be Good, 1988 American comedy film by Orion Pictures Starring Robert Downey Jr., Anthony Michael Hall and Paul Gleason.
Michael, 1996 American fantasy film Starring John Travolta distributed by Warner Bros. Pictures and New Line Cinema
The Newton Boys, 1998 American comedy-drama film Distributed by 20th Century Fox.
Adventures in Appletown (also known as Kings of Appletown or Hidden Treasure of the Mississippi), a 2008 dramedy/adventure film starring twin brothers Dylan Sprouse and Cole Sprouse and Victoria Justice.
Fear the Walking Dead, American post-apocalyptic horror drama television series created by Robert Kirkman and Dave Erickson aired on AMC.
Schultze Gets the Blues, a 2003 German comedy-drama film Distributed by Paramount Classics.
The Bachelorette, an American reality television dating game show aired on ABC.
The Daytripper, 9-time Lone Star Emmy Award-winning travel show aired on PBS.

See also

List of museums in Central Texas

Notes

References

Further reading

External links

 City of New Braunfels official website
 New Braunfels Chamber of Commerce
 

 
Cities in Texas
Cities in Comal County, Texas
Cities in Guadalupe County, Texas
County seats in Texas
German-American history
Greater San Antonio
Populated places on the Guadalupe River (Texas)
Populated places established in 1845
German-American culture in Texas